Bisseuil is a former commune of the Marne department in northeastern France. Since January 2016, Bisseuil is part of the administrative commune Aÿ-Champagne.

Population

See also
Communes of the Marne department
Montagne de Reims Regional Natural Park

References

Former communes of Marne (department)